The 76th New York State Legislature, consisting of the New York State Senate and the New York State Assembly, met in Albany from January 4 to July 21, 1853, during the first year of Horatio Seymour's governorship.

Background
Under the provisions of the New York Constitution of 1846, 32 Senators were elected in single-seat senatorial districts for a two-year term, with the whole Senate being renewed biennially. The senatorial districts (except those in New York City) were made up of entire counties. One hundred and twenty-eight Assemblymen were elected in single-seat districts to a one-year term, with the whole Assembly being renewed annually. The Assembly districts were made up of entire towns, or city wards, forming a contiguous area, all in the same county. The City and County of New York was divided into four senatorial districts, and 16 Assembly districts.

At this time there were two major political parties: the Democratic Party and the Whig Party.

Elections
The New York state election of 1852 was held on November 2. Horatio Seymour (D) was elected governor, defeating the incumbent Washington Hunt (W). Lt. Gov. Sanford E. Church (D) was re-elected. The other two statewide elective offices up for election were also carried by the Democrats.

Sessions
The Legislature met for the regular session at the Old State Capitol in Albany on January 4, 1853, and adjourned on April 13.

William H. Ludlow (D) was elected Speaker with 85 votes against 39 for Jeremiah Ellsworth (W). John S. Nafew (D) was elected Clerk of the Assembly with 86 votes against 40 for the incumbent Richard U. Sherman (W).

On January 19, William McMurray (D) was elected President pro tempore of the Senate.

On April 13, Governor Horatio Seymour called a special session of the Legislature, to conclude the unfinished business of the regular session.

On April 14, the Legislature met for a special session; and adjourned on April 15.

On May 24, the Legislature met for another special session; and adjourned on July 21.

On July 1, Russell Smith (D) was elected Speaker pro tempore, to preside over the Assembly during the absence of Speaker Ludlow.

On July 8, the Assembly impeached Canal Commissioner John C. Mather.

On July 21, near the end of the session, Edwin D. Morgan (W) was elected president pro tempore of the Senate.

On July 27, the New York Court for the Trial of Impeachments (consisting of the State Senate and the New York Court of Appeals), met at Albany, for the first time in State history. Assemblymen Marshall B. Champlain, Arphaxed Loomis, John McBurney, Solomon B. Noble (all four Democrats), Orlando Hastings, Walter L. Sessions and Daniel P. Wood (all three Whigs) appeared as the Managers to prosecute the impeachment. Congressman Rufus W. Peckham (D) appeared for the Defense. After organizing, the Court adjourned.

On August 16, the Impeachment Court met for the trial, which lasted until Mather was acquitted on September 16.

State Senate

Districts

 1st District: Queens, Richmond and Suffolk counties
 2nd District: Kings County
 3rd District: 1st, 2nd, 3rd, 4th, 5th and 6th wards of New York City
 4th District: 7th, 10th, 13th and 17th wards of New York City
 5th District: 8th, 9th and 14th wards of New York City
 6th District: 11th, 12th, 15th, 16th, 18th, 19th, 20th, 21st and 22nd wards of New York City
 7th District: Putnam,  Rockland and Westchester counties
 8th District: Columbia and Dutchess counties
 9th District: Orange and Sullivan counties
 10th District: Greene and Ulster counties
 11th District: Albany and Schenectady counties
 12th District: Rensselaer County
 13th District: Saratoga and Washington counties
 14th District: Clinton, Essex and Warren counties
 15th District: Franklin and St. Lawrence counties
 16th District: Fulton, Hamilton, Herkimer and Montgomery counties
 17th District: Delaware and Schoharie counties
 18th District: Chenango and Otsego counties
 19th District: Oneida County
 20th District: Madison and Oswego counties
 21st District: Jefferson and Lewis counties
 22nd District: Onondaga County
 23rd District: Broome, Cortland and Tioga counties
 24th District: Cayuga and Wayne counties
 25th District: Seneca, Tompkins and Yates counties
 26th District: Chemung and Steuben counties
 27th District: Monroe County
 28th District: Genesee, Niagara and Orleans counties
 29th District: Livingston and Ontario counties
 30th District: Allegany and Wyoming counties
 31st District: Erie County
 32nd District: Cattaraugus and Chautauqua counties

Note: There are now 62 counties in the State of New York. The counties which are not mentioned in this list had not yet been established, or sufficiently organized, the area being included in one or more of the abovementioned counties.

Members

The asterisk (*) denotes members of the previous Legislature who continued in office as members of this Legislature.

Employees
 Clerk: Ira P. Barnes
 Sergeant-at-Arms: Charles Lee
 Doorkeeper: A. N. Beardsley
 Assistant Doorkeeper: George Read

State Assembly

Assemblymen
The asterisk (*) denotes members of the previous Legislature who continued as members of this Legislature.

Party affiliations follow the vote on Speaker.

Employees
 Clerk: John S. Nafew
 Sergeant-at-Arms: John P. Phelps
 Doorkeeper: George D. Wooldridge
 First Assistant Doorkeeper: Hugh Clary
 Second Assistant Doorkeeper: S. A. Brown

Notes

Sources
 The New York Civil List compiled by Franklin Benjamin Hough (Weed, Parsons and Co., 1858) [pg. 109 for Senate districts; pg. 137 for senators; pg. 148–157 for Assembly districts; pg. 244ff for assemblymen]
 Journal of the Senate (76th Session) (1853)
 Journal of the Assembly (76th Session) (1853; Vol. I)
 Journal of the Assembly (76th Session) (1853; Vol. II)
The State Government for 1853 in NYT on January 5, 1853

076
1853 in New York (state)
1853 U.S. legislative sessions